is a railway station in Chūō-ku, Sapporo, Hokkaido, Japan. The station is numbered "N08". It is located on the Namboku Line and Sapporo Streetcar.

The station is located relatively close to Hōsui-Susukino Station on the Tōhō Line, but there are no free transfers between the two stations.

Platforms

Surrounding area
On the south side of the station is located the largest red-light district north of Tokyo, Susukino, in which are concentrated many restaurants, bars, hotels, and adult-entertainment establishments.

National Route 36 (to Muroran)
Sapporo Central Police Station Susukino Police Box
Minami Sanjo Post Office
North Pacific Bank, Susukino branch
Hokkaido Bank, Susukino branch
Tomakomai Shinkin Bank, Sapporo branch
Susukino Lafiler mega store
Underground Shopping Malls (Pole Town & Aurora Town)
Sapporo Tokyu Inn Hotel
Sapporo Toho Plaza cinema
Tanukikoji shopping arcade
Sapporo Ramen Alley

See also
 List of railway stations in Japan

References

External links

 Sapporo Subway Stations

Railway stations in Sapporo
Sapporo Municipal Subway
Chūō-ku, Sapporo